You Don't Know is the debut single by gospel artist Kierra "Kiki" Sheard, released August 17, 2004. The song was chosen as the lead single for Sheard's debut album, I Owe You. The song was specifically written and produced for Sheard by Rodney Jerkins for Darkchild Productions.

Song information
In 2001 Kierra's mother, Karen Clark-Sheard, was faced with a life-threatening crisis when a blood vessel burst during a scheduled hernia surgery. Her doctors only gave her a 2% chance of survival due to her complications. After the blood clot was surgically removed, Clark-Sheard fell into a coma. The coma lasted for weeks, but she made a miraculous recovery. Clark-Sheard's near-death experience is said to have inspired  "You Don't Know".

Chart performance
"You Don't Know" cracked the Billboard Hot R&B/Hip Hop singles list at number 84. It is one of the few singles by the artist to chart while her full-length albums generally have charted well.

Awards
In 2005, the song won a Dove Award for Urban Recorded Song of the Year at the 36th GMA Dove Awards.

Track listing
 You Don't Know (album version) -4:20
 You Don't Know (extended mix) -4:57
 You Don't Know (instrumental) -4:19
 Praise Offering -7:34

References

2004 singles
Gospel songs
Songs written by Rodney Jerkins
2004 songs